HMAS Cairns (J183), named for the city of Cairns, Queensland, was one of 60 s constructed during World War II and one of 20 built for the Admiralty but manned by personnel of and commissioned into the Royal Australian Navy (RAN).

Design and construction

In 1938, the Australian Commonwealth Naval Board (ACNB) identified the need for a general purpose 'local defence vessel' capable of both anti-submarine and mine-warfare duties, while easy to construct and operate. Construction of the prototype  did not go ahead, but the plans were retained. The need for locally built 'all-rounder' vessels at the start of World War II saw the "Australian Minesweepers" (designated as such to hide their anti-submarine capability, but popularly referred to as "corvettes") approved in September 1939, with 60 constructed during the course of the war: 36 ordered by the RAN, 20 (including Cairns) ordered by the British Admiralty but manned and commissioned as RAN vessels, and 4 for the Royal Indian Navy.

Cairns was laid down by Walkers Limited at Maryborough, Queensland on 31 March 1941. She was launched on 7 October 1941 by Mrs. R. D. Walker, wife of the Works Manager of Walkers Limited, and commissioned into the RAN on 11 May 1942.

Operational history

Royal Australian Navy
From entering service until 16 October 1942, Cairns was based in Fremantle and operated as a convoy escort, anti-submarine patroller, and minesweeper. On 16 October, the corvette was reassigned to the British Eastern Fleet and ordered to Kilindini, Kenya, arriving on 14 November.

Cairns remained with the Eastern Fleet until January 1945. Most of this time was spent on patrol or escort duties in the Indian Ocean. The corvette was reassigned to the Mediterranean from June until September 1943. During this time, Cairns was involved in the Allied invasion of Sicily. The corvette was involved in the successful destruction of the submarine, but one convoy ship was torpedoed. Following a refit in Adelaide from May to July 1944, Cairns was redeployed to Colombo, which was her base of operations until January 1945, when the corvette was sent back to Australia.

On arrival in Australian waters, Cairns was assigned to the British Pacific Fleet.

The ship received four battle honours for her wartime service: "Pacific 1942–45", "Indian Ocean 1942–45", "Sicily 1943", and "Okinawa 1945".

Royal Netherlands Navy
Following the end of World War II, all Admiralty-owned Bathurst class corvettes were disposed of. Cairns was paid off in Brisbane on 17 January 1946. She was immediately recommissioned into the Royal Netherlands Navy (RNLN) and renamed HNLMS Ambon.

Indonesian Navy
Following four years of service with the RNLN, the ship was transferred to the Indonesian Navy on 6 April 1950 and renamed KRI Banteng.

Fate
The corvette was broken up for scrap in April 1968.

Citations

References
Books

Journal and news articles

External links

Bathurst-class corvettes of the Royal Australian Navy
Ships built in Queensland
1941 ships
World War II corvettes of Australia
Bathurst-class corvettes of the Indonesian Navy